Georges Bernardi (1922–1999) was a French entomologist, reading and speaking Russian, French and English. He was the only French representative to participate at the elaboration of the International Code of Zoological Nomenclature.

Works

With Le Moult
When working at Eugène Le Moult's shop he wrote some important works in the journal Miscellanea Entomologica:
 1944. Révision des Aporia du groupe d'Agathon, Miscellanea Entomologica, 41, pp. 69–77, 1 plate.
 1947. Nomenclature de formes européennes de l'Euchloe ausonia, Miscellanea Entomologica, 44, pp. 1–24.
 1947. Révision de la classification des espèces holarctiques des genres Pieris et Pontia, Miscellanea Entomologica, 44, pp. 65–80, 5 plates.
 1947. La nomenclature de deux Limenitis européens, Miscellanea Entomologica, 44, pp. 81–86.

At the Paris Museum
More important works were:
 1954. Révision des Pierinae de la faune malgache, 137 pages
 1985. Le polymorphisme et le mimétisme de Papilio dardanus Brown, 50 pages, 3 plates (1 in colours), Bulletin de la société entomologique de France, 90, pp. 1106–1155 (with J. Pierre and T. H. Ngyuen).

As a director of thesis, he supervised the works of J. Plantrou on Charaxes  and of Nguyen Thi Hong on the Apatura.

References 

1922 births
1999 deaths
French lepidopterists
20th-century French zoologists